Foxy Lady is a 1971 Canadian comedy film directed by Ivan Reitman. It was Reitman's debut feature film and was also the first film appearance of both Eugene Levy and Andrea Martin.

Cast
Alan Gordon as Hero
Sylvia Feigel as Leander
Robert McHeady as Mr. Stephens
Patrick Boxill as Mr. Seman
Nicole Morin as Director
Gino Marrocco as Biker
Arch McDonnell as Dr. Saltzman
Mira Pawluk as Alice
Andrea Martin as Girl Next Door
Eugene Levy
Claire-Anne Bundy

References

External links

1971 films
Canadian comedy films
1970s English-language films
Films directed by Ivan Reitman
English-language Canadian films
1971 comedy films
Films produced by Ivan Reitman
1971 directorial debut films
1970s Canadian films